Louin may refer to:
 Louin, Deux-Sèvres, France
 Louin, Mississippi, United States